ReadeREST is a U.S. based company best known for a magnetic eyeglass holder, also called ReadeREST (pronounced Reader Rest)

History 
After turning 40, founder Rick Hopper started using readers and began habitually losing, scratching and dropping his glasses. In 2010, Hopper made prototypes using paperclips and magnets, solving the problem he had with trying to keep his glasses safe and secure. It did not take long for consumer interest to grow. Friends, family, and strangers would ask him about his ReadeREST and wanted their own. Noticing the potential market for the product, Hopper did a patent search and found that it had already been patented by a man named Bernard. To Hopper's luck the patent was for sale. Over the next year, Hopper went to farms markets, gun, golf, and quilt shows to gain a better understanding of his target audience.

In 2012, Hopper landed a spot on Season 3, Episode 6 of ABC's show Shark Tank, resulting in a deal with Lori Greiner. Since the show, ReadeREST has grossed millions with reoccurring air time on QVC and grabbing shelf space with big box retailers, Walmart, Staples, and Ace Hardware.

Products 
ReadeREST is made with "high-grade magnets" and stainless steel. The product can also be used to hold ID badges and manage earbuds.

References

External links
 

Privately held companies of the United States